This is a list of Bailiffs and Dames Grand Cross of the Most Venerable Order of the Hospital of Saint John of Jerusalem.

References

 
 
Saint John